Seulberg station is a railway station in the Seulberg district in the municipality of Friedrichsdorf, located in the Hochtaunuskreis district in Hesse, Germany.

References

Rhine-Main S-Bahn stations
Railway stations in Hesse
Buildings and structures in Hochtaunuskreis